Tammie Spatz-Stone is an American former competitive swimmer. Stone won the bronze medal in the 2002 Pan Pacific Swimming championship alongside Jenny Thompson and Jodie Henry.

Personal life 
Tammie began taking swimming lessons at YMCA.

References 

Year of birth missing (living people)
Living people
American female swimmers
Place of birth missing (living people)
Pan American Games medalists in swimming
Pan American Games gold medalists for the United States
Swimmers at the 1999 Pan American Games
Medalists at the 1999 Pan American Games
21st-century American women